Iota Alpha Kappa was an American collegiate fraternity.

History
It was founded at Union College in 1858.  Roughly 20 chapters were developed, including at Lafayette College, Washington & Jefferson College, Columbia College and Norwich University.  Membership was not restricted to college students.  In 1874, the fraternity was dissolved at a convention held in Easton, Pennsylvania.

Following dissolution, the Washington & Jefferson College chapter founded the Phi Delta Kappa fraternity and became its first chapter. Following the collapse of Phi Delta Kappa, that chapter joined Phi Gamma Delta as the Alpha chapter.

References

Student organizations established in 1858
1874 disestablishments
Student societies in the United States
Defunct fraternities and sororities
1858 establishments in New York (state)